Sister Dr Bernadette Mary Porter  (born 21 July 1952) is a British Roman Catholic nun, educator and academic administrator.

She was educated at Merrow Grange Grammar School (Guildford), Digby Stuart College and King's College London (BEd,  1979; PhD, 1989). She served as Vice-Chancellor, Roehampton University from 1999 to 2004, having previously held various posts at Roehampton Institute.

Honours
She was appointed CBE in 2005 and is a member of the Reform Club.

References

1952 births
Living people
Alumni of King's College London
Alumni of the University of Roehampton
Academics of the University of Roehampton
Commanders of the Order of the British Empire
Place of birth missing (living people)
20th-century English Roman Catholic nuns
21st-century English Roman Catholic nuns